Dilly may refer to:

Places
 Dilly, Mali, a village and rural commune
 Dilly, Wisconsin, United States, an unincorporated community
 Dilly (crater),  a crater in the Elysium quadrangle of Mars

People
 Charles Dilly (1739–1807), English publisher and bookseller, brother and business partner of Edward Dilly
 Edward Dilly (1732–1779), English publisher and bookseller, brother and business partner of Charles Dilly
 Erin Dilly (born 1972), American actress
 Tommy Dilly (1880–1953), Scottish footballer
 Dilly Court, English novelist
 nickname of Dilaver Dilly Duka (born 1989), American soccer player
 nickname of Alfred Dillwyn Dilly Knox (1884–1943), British codebreaker and classical scholar
 nickname of John R. Dilworth (born 1963), American animator, creator of Courage the Cowardly Dog

Fictional characters
 Dilly the Duck, in the British 1984 TV series Thomas the Tank Engine and Friends
 Dilly the Dinosaur, protagonist of a children's book series by Tony Bradman

Other uses
 "Dilly" (song), by Band of Horses, 2011
 Dilly, name in Jamaica for Manilkara zapota, an evergreen tree species

See also
 Derby Dilly, a short-lived 19th century British political faction headed by Edward Smith-Stanley, 14th Earl of Derby
 Dillybag, a traditional Australian Aboriginal woven bag
 Dilly Dilly, a phrase of agreement used in a series of Bud Light commercials in 2017–18
 Dillie Keane (born 1952), English actress, singer and comedian
 Dilli (disambiguation)
 Dili (disambiguation)

Lists of people by nickname